

Ballads
Copies of extant seventeenth-century broadside ballads about William III and Mary II, such as "England's Triumph", "England's Happiness in the Crowning of William and Mary", "A new loyal song, upon King William's Progress into Ireland" and "Royal Courage, King William's Happy Success in Ireland", are housed in Magdalene College's Pepys Library, the National Library of Scotland, and the British Library.

Art

In Dublin city, the display of a white plasterwork horse in the fanlight of a door was believed to denote a household that was Protestant and loyal to the United Kingdom. The horse was a depiction of William's white horse, which he rode during the Battle of Boyne.

In London, an equestrian bronze of the King is to be found in St. James's Square.

Literature
Marjorie Bowen wrote three historical novels about William's life. They are I Will Maintain (1910), Defender of the Faith (1911), and God and the King (1911).

Film
William III of England has been played on screen by Bernard Lee in the 1937 film The Black Tulip, based on the novel by Alexandre Dumas, père.
Henry Daniell in the 1945 film Captain Kidd.
Olaf Hytten in the 1952 film Against All Flags.
Thom Hoffman in the 1992 film Orlando, based on the novel by Virginia Woolf.
Corin Redgrave in the 1995 film England, My England, the story of the composer Henry Purcell.
Bernard Hill in the 2005 film The League of Gentlemen's Apocalypse.
Egbert-Jan Weber in the 2015 film Michiel de Ruyter.

Television
Alan Rowe in the 1969 BBC drama series The First Churchills.
Laurence Olivier in the 1986 NBC TV mini-series Peter the Great.
Jochum ten Haaf in the 2003 BBC miniseries Charles II: The Power & the Passion.
George Webster in Versailles (2015).

Theatre
Carl Prekopp in the 2015 premiere of the play Queen Anne.

References

 
Cultural depictions of English kings
Cultural depictions of Scottish kings